The Journal of Addictive Diseases is a quarterly peer-reviewed medical journal covering addiction medicine. It was established in 1982 as the Advances in Alcohol & Substance Abuse, obtaining its current name in 1991. It is published by Taylor & Francis on behalf of the American Osteopathic Academy of Addiction Medicine, of which it is the official journal. The editor-in-chief is Matthew O. Howard (University of North Carolina at Chapel Hill). According to the Journal Citation Reports, the journal has a 2017 impact factor of 1.762.

References

External links

Addiction medicine journals
Publications established in 1982
Quarterly journals
Taylor & Francis academic journals
English-language journals
Academic journals associated with learned and professional societies of the United States